WFAM (1050 kHz) is a commercial AM radio station in Augusta, Georgia.  It has a Christian talk and teaching radio format and is owned by Wilkins Communications Network.  WFAM carries shows by national Christian leaders as well as local preachers.  Hosts include Charles Stanley, David Jeremiah, June Hunt and John MacArthur.  It is a brokered programming station, in which hosts buy time on the station and may use their shows to ask for donations to their ministries.  Some programming is provided by the Salem Radio Network.

By day, WFAM is powered at 5,000 watts using a non-directional antenna.  But because AM 1050 is a clear channel frequency, WFAM must greatly reduce power at night to 82 watts.  The transmitter is on Laney Walker Boulevard at Hayes Drive.

History
On March 10, 1952, the station first signed on the air as WAUG.  It has been a Christian radio station since the 1980s.

See also

Media in Augusta, Georgia

References

External links

FAM
Radio stations established in 1978
1978 establishments in Georgia (U.S. state)
FAM